Simone Iacone (born February 8, 1984 in Pescara) is an Italian auto racing driver. After winning the Italian Alfa Challenge (under 25) in 2003 and the European Alfa Romeo 147 Challenge in 2004, he made his Italian Supertutismo Championship debut in the 2006.

Career
Simone had a successful career in karts, finishing 2nd in the Italian Kart Championship in 1996 and 1997 (60mini kart, 100junior). In the 2003 he began competing in the Italian Alfa Challenge where he took in 10 races 7 podium, 3 pole positions, 5 lap records and winning the Under 25 title.

In 2004 he won the European Alfa Romeo 147 Challenge after 3 wins (Monza, Valencia, Spa) and 7 podiums.

Iacone joined Zerocinque Motorsport in 2006 for its Italian Superturismo Championship campaign, where he finished in sixth place. The championship ran in two rounds of the 2006 World Touring Car Championship season.

In 2010 he won the Italian Seat Leon Supercopa driving for Team Prs Group, winning 4 races, 1 pole position and 8 podiums.

Complete World Touring Car Championship results
(key) (Races in bold indicate pole position) (Races in italics indicate fastest lap)

References

External links

http://www.trofeocastrolseatleonsupercopa.it/

Living people
1984 births
Sportspeople from Pescara
Italian racing drivers
World Touring Car Championship drivers
Superstars Series drivers